Bradley Paul Avakian (born February 4, 1961) is an American politician who served as a Democrat in the Oregon House, the Oregon Senate, and as the state's nonpartisan elected  Labor Commissioner.

He was appointed Labor Commissioner by Governor Ted Kulongoski on April 8, 2008, and was subsequently elected statewide on November 4, 2008. He was re-elected in 2012 and 2014.

In 2016, he was the Democratic nominee for Oregon Secretary of State and was defeated by former state representative Dennis Richardson.

Early life
Born in Fresno, California, he is the son of Larry and Catherine Avakian. He is of Armenian descent. His grandfather was Avak Avakian, who came to America from Muş in 1898. His grandmother, Sirpoohi Antoyan, came from Bitlis in 1900.

Avakian was raised in Washington County, Oregon. He was educated in Oregon's public schools and graduated with a Juris doctor from Lewis & Clark Law School in 1990. He helped create the YMCA's Juvenile Restitution Program while in law school.
 
Avakian then worked as a civil rights attorney. He co-founded the Oregon League of Conservation Voters' (OLCV) Washington County chapter, and he was appointed by Governor Barbara Roberts to lead the State Board of Psychologist Examiners. He served as Honorary Chair of the Oregon Business Leadership Network, a coalition of employers committed to hiring the disabled. Avakian lives in the Portland metropolitan area in the city of Beaverton.

Political career
Avakian ran for the Oregon State Senate in 1998, losing to incumbent Republican Tom Hartung.

Avakian was elected to represent District 34, on Portland's west side, in the Oregon House of Representatives in 2002. He defeated Portland police officer John Scruggs, the only Republican to lose in Washington County that year, with 53 percent of the vote.

Avakian was elected to the Oregon State Senate, representing District 17, in 2006.

While in the legislature, Avakian was honored by both the Oregon AFL-CIO and the SEIU Local 503 for his work on behalf of working families. In the state Senate he chaired the Environment and Natural Resources Committee, and in 2007 the OLCV named him the "Consensus Builder of the Year," recognizing him for passing an extension of the Oregon Bottle Bill and a renewable energy act. In 2008 he led a coalition to approve water supply development for rural communities.

In July 2007, Avakian announced his candidacy for the Democratic nomination for Oregon Secretary of State. He later withdrew from the race when he was appointed by governor Ted Kulongoski to be Commissioner of the Oregon Bureau of Labor and Industries in early 2008 after Dan Gardner announced his resignation. Gardner was the first Commissioner of Labor and Industries to leave mid-term for a new job.

In April 2011, Avakian announced that he would seek the Democratic nomination for Oregon's 1st congressional district in the United States House of Representatives. The seat was held by fellow Democrat David Wu, who resigned from Congress before the end of his term due to allegations of sexual misconduct. Avakian lost in the Democratic primary to Suzanne Bonamici, who succeeded him in both the Oregon House and Senate.

In July 2015, Avakian ordered Aaron and Melissa Klein, owners of Sweet Cakes by Melissa in Gresham, to pay a lesbian couple $135,000 in damages for unlawful discrimination in public accommodations after the bakery refusing to make a cake for the couple's wedding. The owners cited their Christian beliefs against same-sex marriage. The Kleins' appealed in the Oregon Court of Appeals, but the ruling was upheld. However, the Supreme Court vacated this ruling and sent it back to the Court of Appeals of Oregon to rule in a manner consistent with the case Masterpiece Cakeshop v. Colorado Civil Rights Commission.

On November 8, 2016, Avakian lost his bid for Oregon Secretary of State to Republican Dennis Richardson, the first time a Republican was elected to statewide office in Oregon since 2002.

Avakian announced in July 2017 he would not seek reelection to a third full term.

Electoral history

References

External links
 Brad Avakian campaign web site
 Voters' Pamphlet 2006 statement, page 28

1961 births
21st-century American politicians
American people of Armenian descent
Lewis & Clark Law School alumni
Living people
Democratic Party members of the Oregon House of Representatives
Oregon Commissioners of Labor and Industries
Oregon lawyers
Democratic Party Oregon state senators
Oregon State University alumni
Politicians from Beaverton, Oregon
Ethnic Armenian politicians